The Bruntwood Prize for Playwriting is a British competition for playwriting, the largest of its kind in Europe—in 2019 it received 2561 entries. Since its inception in 2005, more than 15,000 scripts have been entered, £304,000 has been awarded to 34 prize-winning writers, and 24 winning productions have been staged in 38 UK-wide venues. In 2015 the prize celebrated its 10th anniversary and is now recognised as a launch-pad for some of the country's most respected and produced playwrights. The Prize is awarded to scripts that are original and unperformed. The award is a joint venture between the property company Bruntwood and the Royal Exchange Theatre in Manchester the Prize is an opportunity for writers of any background and experience to enter unperformed plays to be judged by a panel of industry experts for a chance to win part of a prize fund totalling £40,000.

Each winner enters into a development process with the Royal Exchange Theatre in an endeavour to bring their work to production. There have been co-productions with Lyric Hammersmith, Live Theatre, Soho Theatre, Bush Theatre, Orange Tree Theatre, Sherman Theatre, High Tide and the Royal Court Theatre. Work has also gone on to be produced internationally from Australia, USA, Germany, France, to Canada and Sweden.  In addition to a high proportion of winning and shortlisted plays being produced professionally, each of the top 100 plays receives individual feedback from the Royal Exchange Theatre’s creative team.

Its alumni include some the UK’s most respected playwrights such as Duncan Macmillan and Alistair McDowall.

The Bruntwood Prize is biennial.

Process 
All plays are submitted anonymously to the competition and are read by an expert panel of readers appointed by the Royal Exchange Theatre. There is an extensive five-stage process to the reading before creating the shortlist. The final panel of readers, including key artistic staff from the Royal Exchange Theatre, compile a shortlist of 15 plays for the judges to consider. The judges receive the shortlist of scripts and appoint winners. The judging panel has no knowledge about the writers of each script and the writers are only revealed when the judging process is complete.

The readers as a cohort have a broad range of experiences and specialisms to try and give each submitted script the best chance.

The submitted scripts therefore go through a rigorous process to make it to the longlist and shortlist;

 Phase One – reading the first 30 pages to identify approximately 900 scripts of potential interest.
 Phase Two – a new set of readers reading the full script to identify the Top 250
 Phase Three – a new set of readers reading the full script to identify the Top 40 for discussion in Phase Four and the longlist of Top 100 scripts eligible for feedback within 2019.
 Phase Four – Script Meeting to discuss the Top 40 scripts and to decide on the Shortlist of scripts to be issued to the judges. This meeting is with core artistic staff at the Royal Exchange Theatre and external freelance directors.

As each script proceeds through the phases of reading it is addressed by a diverse team of readers. The Royal Exchange manages the reading process to ensure that each script is seen by readers with different ages, genders, work history, ethnicities and interests. The aim of the Prize is to find great plays in whatever shape or form they appear so the entry criteria are deliberately broad to allow first time writers and more experienced playwrights to be assessed on a level footing.

Of the 2019 readers, who chose to provided information;

 15% Consider themselves disabled
 41% are BAME 
 65% are female and 3% are non-binary
 28% are LGBTA+
 They are aged from their early 20s to over 70 years old

The cohort of readers is made up of theatre professionals, skilled in reading scripts. They include directors, designers, dramaturges and literary managers at leading producing theatres, actors, national critics and theatre commentators and previous Bruntwood Prize winners (the only playwrights to read- as they are no longer eligible to enter the Prize)

Award categories 
Since inception in 2015, multiple Awards have been given- including the overall Bruntwood Prize for Playwriting and the Judges Awards. As of 2019 the categories are:

• The Bruntwood Prize for Playwriting-a first prize of £16,000
• A Judges' Awards of £8,000
• An Original New Voice Award of £8,000- available to playwrights who have not had full-length play professionally produced for 12 performances or more in a professional venue. All scripts entered by these playwrights are also eligible for the Bruntwood Prize, and Judges Award.
• An International Award of £8,000- open to international playwrights invited to anonymously apply via named international partners: The BANFF Centre in Canada; Belvoir Theatre and Melbourne Theatre Company in Australia; Berkeley Rep and Playwrights Horizons in the USA.

As of 2017, the judges can also choose to award Commendations of £4,000 and a funded reading at a London Theatre venue.

Judges 
The shortlisted scripts are judged by a prestigious panel of figures from across the arts industry. Until his death in 2019, Michael Oglesby CBE DL, founder of the Bruntwood Group and chairman of The Oglesby Charitable Trust participated in every Judging panel. Acting Artistic Directors of the Royal Exchange Theatre also participate in every panel.

2019 
Alongside Joint Artistic Director of the Royal Exchange Theatre Bryony Shanahan, judges include: Kwame Kwei-Armah (Chair), Anna Jordan, Bruntwood Prize-winning playwright; Bridget Minamore, journalist, poet and critic; Jenny Sealey MBE, Artistic Director, Graeae Theatre Company; Kate Vokes, Director of Social Impact, Bruntwood and actor Shane Zaza.

New to the panel this year is "The People's Judge", Faith Yianni, a member of the public selected following a search by the Prize and leading theatre critic Lyn Gardner, to bring an audience member’s perspective to the judging process.

2017 
Chaired by broadcaster Kirsty Lang the 2017 judges were: Associated Artistic Director of the Royal Exchange Theatre, Matthew Xia; playwright and former Bruntwood winner, Phil Porter; screenwriter and producer, Russell T Davies; playwright Lucy Prebble; director Lyndsey Turner; and actor, Alfred Enoch.

2016 
Chaired by Nicholas Hytner, former Artistic Director, National Theatre; the 2015 Prize judges were: Artistic Director of the Royal Exchange Theatre, Sarah Frankcom; playwright and former Bruntwood winner, Vivienne Franzmann; Artistic Director, Actors Touring Company, Ramin Gray; playwright Bryony Lavery; writer and broadcaster, Miranda Sawyer; and actor and writer, Meera Syal CBE.

2013 
Chaired by Broadcaster Dame Jenni Murray the 2013 Prize judges were: award-winning playwrights David Eldridge and Tanika Gupta MBE; Associate Director of the National Theatre, Marianne Elliott; actress, Suranne Jones; Artistic Director of the Royal Exchange Theatre, Greg Hersov; and theatre critic, Benedict Nightingale.

2011 
The judging panel was chaired by playwright Simon Stephens and included, Royal Exchange Artistic Director Sarah Frankcom, writer Jackie Kay, and actors Sue Johnston and Maxine Peake.

2008 
The judging panel was chaired by actor and director Richard Wilson and included actress Brenda Blethyn OBE, actor Michael Sheen, film director Roger Michell, playwright Roy Williams, and Royal Exchange Artistic Director Greg Hersov.

2005 
Judges were chaired by Chris Smith MP and consisted of Brenda Blythyn OBE, the much loved actress, Director of the National Theatre Nicholas Hynter, actor, playwright and singer Kwame Kwei Armah, and The Founding Artistic Director of the Royal Exchange Theatre Company Braham Murray

Winners and nominees

pre-2005 
A pilot version of the prize, running in the North West area of the UK only, was won by playwright Nicola Schofield in 2003.

2005

Monster by Duncan Macmillan (Winner) 
The Cracks in My Skin by Phil Porter (Judges' Award)
Pretend You Have Big Buildings by Ben Musgrave (Judges' Award)

2008 

 Mogadishu by Vivienne Franzmann (Joint Winner)
 Winterlong by Andrew Sheridan (Joint Winner)
 The Butcher Boys by Naylah Ahmed (Joint Winner) 
 Salt by Fiona Peek (Joint Winner)

2011
 Three Birds  by Janice Okoh (Winner)
 Brilliant Adventures by Alistair McDowall (Judges' Award)
 Britannia Waves The Rules by Gareth Farr (Judges' Award)
 Shadow Play by Louise Monaghan (Judges' Award)
 A Map of the Region by Tim Luscombe
 Climbing Snakes by Curtis Cole
 I and the Village by Silva Semerciyan
 I Started a Fire by Miriam Battye
 One Look by Cornell S John
 White by Kenneth Emson

2013
 Yen by Anna Jordan (Winner) 
 So Here We Are by Luke Norris (Judges' Prize)
 The Rolling Stone by Chris Urch (Judges' Prize)
 Bird by Katherine Chandler (Judges' Prize)
 December by Alice Birch
 Dorm by Lynda Radley
 Imam (Faith) by Toby Clarke
 P’YongYang by In-Sook Chappell
 Russian Dolls by Kate Lock
 Waste by David Kantounas

2015
 Wish List by Katherine Soper (Winner)
 The Almighty Sometimes by Kendall Feaver (Judges' Award)
 Sound of Silence by Chloe Todd Fordham (Judges' Award)
 Parliament Square by James Fritz (Judges' Award)
 How My Light Is Spent by Alan Harris (Judges' Award)
 Rails by Simon Longman
 Tabs by Ellie Kendrick
 Wild is De Wind by Chino Odimba
 Madra by Frances Poet
 Jonestown by Kellie Smith

2017
 Heartworm by Timothy X Atack (Winner)
 King Brown by Laurie Nunn (Judges' Award)
 Plow by Sharon Clark (Judges' Award)
 Electric Rosary by Tim Foley (Judges' Award)
 Oh Graveyard, You Can’t Hold Me Always by Alan McKendrick
 A Place For We by Archie Maddocks
 Pumpjack by Daniel Foxsmith
 This Is Not America by Joshua Val Martin (Commended)
 when after all it was you and me by Kevin Doyle
 A Bit Of Light by Rebecca Callard (Commended)

2019

 Shed: Exploded View by Phoebe Eclair-Powell (Winner)
 Akedah by Michael John O’Neill  (Original New Voice Award)
 Glee & Me by Stuart Slade (Judges Award)
 Ballybaile by Jody O’Neill 
 black bird by babirye bukilwa
 Neptune by Sam Grabiner
 The European Hare by Sami Ibrahim
 Glass by Jacob Kay
 Salty Irina by Eve Leigh
 Hares by Lee Mattison

International Shortlist 

 untitled f*ck m*ss s**gon play by Kimber Lee (The Bruntwood Prize International Award)
 Tambo & Bone by Dave Harris (Commendation) 
 Pavlov’s Dogs by Emme Hoy
 This Land Was Made by Tori Sampson 
 Periods of Collapse OR Mother Russia by Lauren Yee

2022

 TIME,LIKE THE SEA by Georgia Bruce
 The Institute by David Dawson 
 The China Play by Jeremy Green
 Leave the morning to the morning by Paddy Hughes (Original New Voices Award)
 Bindweed by Martha Loader (Judges Award)
 Allah in the walls by Jasmin Mandi-Ghomi
 THREE by Jill O’Halloran
 BULLRING TECHNO MAKEOUT JAMZ by Nathan Queeley-Dennis (Winner)
 (THE)Woman by Jane Upton

Online resources 
To support writers to create scripts for the stage, the Bruntwood Prize provides free to access resources on their website. These include; promoting opportunities and events for playwrights around the UK and Republic of Ireland, blogs and long-form articles from playwrights and stage writing tutorials. In 2015 they launch the a regular series of Livestream workshops hosted by leading playwrights. In 2019 the first 'Toolkit' series to take a writer through writing a play for the first time

References

2006 establishments in England
Awards established in 2006
Dramatist and playwright awards
English literary awards